The Alba is a left tributary of the river Șușița in Romania. It discharges into the Șușița in Răcoasa.

References

External links
 Valea Șușiței 

Rivers of Romania
Rivers of Vrancea County